Marvdasht (also romanized as Marv Dasht) is a city and the capital of Marvdasht County, Fars Province, Iran.  At the 2006 census, its population was 123,858, in 29,134 families.

Name 
Some historians hold that Marvdasht was originally the name of one of the neighborhoods of the ancient city of Estakhr, until gradually the whole area was called Marvdasht. Others have argued that marv was the name of a plant which grew in the area and the suffix dasht (meaning plain in the Persian language) was added to form a descriptive placename.

History 
Marvdasht is as ancient as the history of Iran and the Persian Empire. Its former capital Persepolis is in the vicinity of the city, and few kilometers farther Naqsh-e-Rostam, Naqsh-e Rajab and the ruins of the ancient city of Estakhr are reminiscent of the region's importance in historic times. Archaeological excavations have shown that civilized people had already been living in the Marvdasht Plains for millennia when Darius chose the plains of mount Rahmat for his royal residence.

The modern city of Marvdasht was constructed in the 20th century. After the Pahlavi government built a sugar factory in 1935 (1314 Persian calendar), the city gradually developed around the factory. More and more people left the nearby villages or abandoned their nomadic life to settle in the developing city. People from farther areas also migrated to the city. In the years before the Islamic Revolution Marvdasht became the most important industrial city of Fars province, as other factories such as the petrochemical complex, Azmayesh (producing household appliances and intended to be biggest in the middle east), the Charmineh leather factory, the Fars meat complex and the Dadli biscuit company were constructed. These required a huge workforce, and the population of Marvdasht increased until it became the second most populated city in Fars province.

The fertile lands around the city were cultivated to make Marvdasht into the major center of Iranian agriculture, producing more wheat, maize, tomato, cucumber and other agricultural products than any other region.

Geographical features 

Marvdasht is one of the northern cities and also counties of Fars  province. The city is located 45 km north of Shiraz  and has an altitude of 1620 meters above the sea level. The county has an area of 3687 square kilometers and neighbors Arsenjan in the east, Pasargad in the north, Khorambid and Eghlid in the northwest, Sepidan in the southwest and Shiraz in the south. There are three cities in the county: Marvdasht, Seydan and Kamfirouz. Marvdasht as a county is divided into four districts: Central, Kamfirouz, Doroudzan and Seydan. Marvdasht has a cold weather in the hilly areas and moderate climate in other regions.

Higher education 
The city has six universities: Islamic Azad University, Marvdasht Branch; Fars Science and Research University; Payame Noor University, Marvdasht center; a branch of Technical and Vocational University; and a branch of University of Applied Science and Technology.

Archaeology 

The Tokyo University Iraq-Iran Archaeological Expedition, headed by Namio Egami, carried out three seasons of excavations in the Marv Dasht plain from 1956 to 1965.

The excavations took place at the following prehistoric mounds situated in the vicinity of Marvdasht and Persepolis.

 Tall-i Bakun A and B
 Tall-i Gap A
 Tall-i Jari A and B
 Tall-i Mushki

At Tall-e Gap many ceramic items were found. The site was identified as an important settlement of the ancient Bakun culture, belonging to the Middle Bakun sub-phase of the 5th millennium BCE Chalcolithic.

References

External links 

Marvdasht Islamic Azad University
Farsnama in Persian on Marvdasht
 Marvdasht
 Marvdasht wall
 Persepolis Village

Populated places in Marvdasht County
Cities in Fars Province